Naor is a Hebrew given name and family name meaning enlightened. Naor may refer to:

People

Given name
Naor Abudi (born 1993), Israeli football player
Naor Dahan (born 1990), Israeli football player
Naor Gilon (born 1964), Israeli diplomat
Naor Hayon (born 1997), Israeli artist and decorated war hero
Naor Peser (born 1985), Israeli football player
Naor Zion (born 1973), Israeli actor and comedian

Surname
Assaf Naor (born 1975), Czech-Israeli mathematician
Esther Raziel-Naor (1911–2002), Israeli politician and activist
Matan Naor (born 1980), Israeli basketball player
Miriam Naor (born 1947), Israeli judge
Moni Naor (born 1961), Israeli computer scientist
Shira Naor (born 1993), Israeli actress
Yigal Naor (born 1958), Israeli actor

Other uses
Naor's Friends, Israeli television series
Naor-Reingold Pseudorandom Function

See also
Nur (name)

Hebrew-language given names
Hebrew-language surnames